Norgesic is the brand name of a muscle relaxant produced by Medicis Pharmaceutical (currently Valeant Pharmaceuticals). The generic is a combination of 385 mg of paracetamol, 25 mg of orphenadrine citrate and 30 mg of caffeine.

It was discontinued in the United States by the Food and Drug Administration in October 2015 but is still available in Scandinavia, Austria, Greece, Thailand, Australia and Hong Kong.

References

Aspirin
Caffeine
Muscle relaxants
Combination drugs